Cowan Station may refer to:
Cowan Station, California, former name of Dunmovin, California
Cowan railway station, New South Wales, Australia